Malaysian literature is the collection of literary works produced in the Malay peninsula until 1963 and in Malaysia thereafter. Malaysian literature is typically written in any of the country's four main languages: Malay, English, Chinese and Tamil. It portrays various aspects of Malaysian life and comprises an important part of the culture of Malaysia.

The earliest works of Malaysian literature were transmitted orally in the absence of writing scripts. Oral literature encompasses a variety of genres of Malay folklore, such as myths, legends, folk tales, romances, epics, poetry, proverbs, origin stories and oral histories. Oral tradition thrived among the Malays, but continues to survive among the indigenous people of Malaysia, including the Orang Asli and numerous ethnic groups in Sarawak and Sabah.

Overview

Early Malays literature was mainly influenced by Indian epics, such as the Mahabharata and the Ramayana, which later included other traditions that now form the Malay literary heritage prose which were delivered through generations by oral, such as the Hikayat Mara Karma, Hikayat Panca Tanderan and Hikayat Gul Bakawali. Much of the stories were recompiled and republished into books, driven by Dewan Bahasa dan Pustaka, the national language society. Malay romantic tales were also sourced from the Panji cycle of Hindu Java. There were also several forms of Malay poetry, which are either in the form of pantun (poems that rhymed with each other and are didactic in its every sense), syair (a long narrative poem, that is made up of four stanzas and recited with a tone akin to singing), gurindam and seloka and are still remain popular until today.

For the Orang Asli, literature was and still is constituted by accounts of actual events. Different ethnic groups have different versions of the same story, although there are several recurring themes and elements in every tale.

The cultural practices of the indigenous people in Sarawak are shaped in part by oral traditions. Themes like the relationship of the people to their past, particularly their ancestry, and the spirit world, including its influence on the production of food and health are the primary themes of the oral literature of various ethnic groups in Sarawak. The recitation of oral literature is often accompanied by rituals.

The oral traditions of Sabah encompass folk tales and legends, such as creation myths, that have been preserved by the ethnic groups in the state. This oral literature is recited during ceremonies conducted by priestesses, who serve as ritual specialists, faith healers and spirit mediums.

By the 19th century, oral literature on the Malay peninsula was superseded by written literature. This was attributed largely in part to the introduction of Islam to the Peninsula by the 15th century and the adoption of the Jawi script as well as their surging fervor of nationalism that had seeped through the intellectuals, educated in Turkey or in Al-Azhar University, in Egypt. This tradition was influenced both by earlier oral traditions and Islamic literature from the Middle East. Works during this time ranged from theological literature that discusses religion as the crucial solution towards social problems as well as colonialism (Melati Kota Bharu by Abdul Kadir Adabi) and legal digests, to romances (Nasib Hasnah by Abdullah Sidek; discusses of the principles of romance and long-lasting relationship within the husband and the wife, moral anecdotes (commonly seen in short stories throughout 1920s and the 1930s), popular tales of Islamic prophets and even animal tales, which were written in a number of styles ranging from religious to the Hikayat form.

The literary traditions of the Malay sultanates were distinct in that scribes were hired to record the significant events of the time. One important work of this period was Sejarah Melayu (The Malay Annals), which was written during the era of the Malacca Sultanate, rewritten in 1536 and revised in 1612.

A surge of new, modern writers gave the birth of what considered as a novelty then, in the form of novel and short story. The colonialism and the increasing numbers of intellectuals mainly educated in MPSI (Maktab Perguruan Sultan Idris) or MCKK (Malay College Kuala Kangsar) had such profound impact throughout the development of the two forms. First developed by Abdullah Munshi in his Hikayat Pelayaran, it is developed more by the end of the 1920s and throughout the 1930s. Much of the works were didactic in every sense, implementing elements of religion and theology, and a critique of the social problems that surfaced and deemed to halt such progresses of economic prosperity as well as independence. In every sense, their novels often melancholic and portrayed the Malay proletariat class in an idealistic manner, much driven with realism as well as romanticism. Writers during this period were Abdul Rahim Kajai, Harun Aminurrashid and to a lesser extent, Abdullah Sidek.

During the Japanese occupation, literature were mainly driven with such fervor of the Emperor of Japan and were published in magazines (Fajar Asia as such). Most of the works centered about the strength of the Japanese Army and their successes, and Japanese-induced nationalistic fervor. Not much of the novel, short story nor poetry were written during this period, only a few remained from the 1930s such as Ishak Haji Muhammad and Abdul Rahim Kajai.

Hikayat
The hikayat is a form of Malay literature that writes concerning the adventures of heroes and legends from the pre-modern time period within the Malay archipelago (spanning modern Indonesia and Malaysia, especially in Sumatra), it may also chronicle royalties and events surrounding them. The stories they contain, though based on history, are heavily romanticized.

Poetry
Traditional Malay poetry was used for entertainment and the recording of history and laws. There are three forms of traditional Malay poetry: the mantera, the pantun and the syair. Modern Malay poetry consists of the sajak.

List of writers

See also
 May 13: Declassified Documents on the Malaysian Riots of 1969
 Terengganu Inscription Stone
 Malaysian National Laureate

References

Sources 
 Adopted from Selected Poems and Short Stories Form 1 textbook
 Adopted from Selected Poems and Short Stories Form 4 textbook
 Adopted from Antologi Tingkatan 1 textbook
 Adopted from Antologi Tingkatan 2 textbook
 Adopted from Antologi Tingkatan 3 textbook
 Adopted from Antologi Tingkatan 4 textbook
 Adopted from Antologi Tingkatan 5 textbook

 Quayum, Mohammad A., (2001) Malaysian Literature in English: A Critical Reader. Kuala Lumpur: Pearson Education, .

External links

Literature of Malaysia at The Encyclopedia of Malaysia
Tradition Malay Canonical Texts
Sastera Melayu

 
Malaysian culture